Elisa Ann Schwartz, mostly known by her stage name Elisa Jordana, is an American radio and TV personality, musician, writer, and online talk-show host. She is best known for her appearances on The Howard Stern Show and as a former member of the dance-pop band Cobra Starship.

Early life 
Jordana was born and raised in Old Bridge, New Jersey. She grew up listening to New Kids on the Block and Whitney Houston. She wrote her first song at age seven; by the time she was in her teens she was already writing songs for her high school's musicals. She moved to New York City at 17 and continued to write and play around the city.

Jordana studied in Radio, Television, and Digital Communications at Connecticut School of Broadcasting, the same school fellow former Howard Stern staff member Artie Lange attended. She also attended Berklee College of Music for a couple of semesters before joining Cobra Starship.

Career 
She began her entertainment career as the keytar player for the dance-pop band Cobra Starship.

Music
Jordana was an original member of Cobra Starship as a keytarist and backup singer. In 2007, she parted ways with the band to focus on her solo career, launching singles such as "Fuck You, I'm Fine," "Online Sweetheart," and an album titled Introducing Elisa Jordana.

Radio
Jordana first made her debut on The Howard Stern Show in November 2011. She was interviewed by Howard Stern about her relationship with a writer of the show, Benjy Bronk. Jordana appeared in studio nearly a dozen times after that for interviews, games, and musical performances.

After 12 appearances live in studio, Jordana was hired as a staff writer on the program.

Writer
After writing comedy for The Howard Stern Show, Jordana became a student of The New York Times Best Selling Author Susan Shapiro. Jordana has written articles for XOJane, Marie Claire, Yahoo, and The Rumpus.

Television
Outside of making multiple appearances on Howard Stern On Demand, Jordana first made her television debut on the Fuse TV reality television series, Redemption Song. The show was hosted by professional wrestler Chris Jericho and was based on 11 women who competed to win a record deal with Geffen Records.

In 2016, Jordana made her film debut in the SyFy television movie Sharknado: The 4th Awakens, along with her dog Kermit.

Radar Online confirmed in April 2017 that Jordana signed on to become a new cast member in the Bravo reality series Vanderpump Rules.

Online talk show host
Once she left The Howard Stern Show, Jordana created her own talk show titled Kermit and Friends. She started broadcasting the show on Spreecast in February 2015 and lasted for over a year. The show was heavily featured on The Howard Stern Show and received acknowledgment from talk-show host Jimmy Kimmel.

In 2017, after being disappointed in appearing briefly in Vanderpump Rules for a single season, Jordana worked at a private equity firm selling gold to wealthy investors before the company got shut down due to various issues and COVID-19. A month before losing her dog Kermit, Jordana got to work from home which in her own words was "a blessing from God that I got to spend the last month with Kermit on my lap as my coworker." Jordana joined the Christian Church and through the church, she was inspired to start the Kermit And Friends podcast up again to celebrate Kermit's life. She was soon joined by personalities such as Victoria Asher, Rachel Luba, John Melendez, The Drew and Mike Podcast, and a variety of other celebrities, pets, and puppets. A big storyline has been Jordana's chaotic engagement to Andy Dick, who often appears on the podcast inebriated after initially being the show's reverend.

Jordana has also featured several members of the Wack Pack on her podcast, including High Pitch Erik and Wendy the Retard.

On April 3, 2022, Dick appeared on the podcast badly beaten up and was visited by medics.

In September 2022, Jordana began doing "IRL" (In real life) live streams.

See also 
 Connecticut School of Broadcasting
 List of keytarists

References

External links

 
 
 
 
 

Living people
American radio personalities
21st-century American comedians
Participants in American reality television series
Keytarists
People from Old Bridge Township, New Jersey
American people of Italian descent
American people of Jewish descent
Musicians from New Jersey
Cobra Starship members
Year of birth missing (living people)